Serghei Pașcenco (born 18 December 1982) is a Moldovan professional footballer who plays as a goalkeeper for Moldovan National Division club Sheriff Tiraspol and the Moldova national team.

Career

Club
Pașcenco signed a three-year contract with Alania Vladikavkaz side at the start of 2008 season.
Pașcenco joined Iranian side Malavan in 2012.

On 26 June 2014, Pașcenco returned to Sheriff Tiraspol for a third spell at the club, leaving the club at the end of his contract in June 2015.

On 5 January 2018, Pașcenco returned to Sheriff Tiraspol for the fourth time.

International
Pașcenco received his first call-up to Moldova in 2003.

Career statistics

Club

International

References

External links

1982 births
Living people
People from Tiraspol
Footballers from Transnistria
Moldovan footballers
Moldovan expatriate footballers
Moldova international footballers
Expatriate footballers in Russia
Expatriate footballers in Iran
Association football goalkeepers
Moldovan Super Liga players
Persian Gulf Pro League players
FC Sheriff Tiraspol players
FC Tiraspol players
FC Spartak Vladikavkaz players
Malavan players
FC Tighina players
FC Orenburg players
Moldovan expatriate sportspeople in Iran
Moldovan expatriate sportspeople in Russia
FC Sheriff Tiraspol non-playing staff